Chelav Rural District is a rural district (dehestan) in the Central District of Amol County, Mazandaran Province, Iran. At the 2006 census, its population was 4,247, in 1,154 families. The rural district has 30 villages. In terms of geographical Chelav Rural District at various times in various villages. In "Mazandaran and Astarabadi" by Rabino, Chlav is the one of eight blocks of Amol and 19 small and large villages. Of these, only the name of the village: "Paradymh, Tyaf, Pasha Kola, Chmh Ben and Gngrj neighborhood" of the current five villages of seven villages Chlav are doable and villages' bars and Shahneh totally "Afrasiyab dynasty for winter migration is considered Rabino .
People Chelav heat and cold in the winter and summer people, but due to favorable weather, households are constantly living in this area. Afrasiyab dynasty of Chelav Rural District countryside villages and rural Qshlaqshan "Blair, Shahneh totally, bars, Khrmvn Generally, fire congestion" is in Amol. Location Afrasiyab dynasty in Amol 1300Shmsy years and before that the Shahandasht neighborhood and near the bottom of the market called "Chlavy neighborhood" in the past, "Chlabh head" was called. The last group of Afrasiyab dynasty in the north-west of Amol, called "Rahmat Abad" settled today is part of Amol.

References 

Rural Districts of Mazandaran Province
Amol County